Romulus Community School District, also referred to as Romulus Community Schools (RCS), is a public school district in Romulus, Michigan in Metro Detroit. The district's Administration Offices & Transportation Department is located at 36540 Grant Road.

As of Summer 2013, the Inkster Public Schools District was entirely dissolved. The Romulus school district absorbed some of the Inkster boundary. Students south of Michigan Avenue and west of Middlebelt were rezoned to Romulus.

The district serves most of Romulus, portions of Inkster, and a portion of Westland; the Westland portion was formerly in the Inkster school district.

Schools

The following are the schools in the school district as of July 1, 2010:

Other district buildings 
Romulus Community High/Middle School (7th – 12th grade)
L.G. Burton Center (early childhood/preschool)
Cory GSRP Center

Former district schools
Beverly Elementary (Guidance Center Head Start & Administrative Offices)
Cory Elementary (closed 2010—now GSRP Center)
Gordonier Elementary (razed—site is now vacant lot)
Harrison Elementary (occupied by Central Global Express)
Hayti-Beverly Elementary (razed—site is now vacant lot)
Merriman Elementary (now Romulus Alternative Middle/High School)
Mt. Pleasant Elementary (Romulus/Van Buren Adult Education Center)
Romulus Elementary (original school located on Olive near downtown area—now the Romulus Police Department)
Texas Elementary (schoolhouse—remodeled into office building)
North Middle (still in operation—now Romulus Middle School)
South Middle (original location of Romulus High School—razed for now former Senior Citizens Park)

References

External links

 
 Romulus Community School District (Archive) (2007-2009)
 School district map from the Michigan Department of Information Technology Center for Geographic Information - See 2008 map (prior to the closure of Inkster school district)

School districts in Michigan
Education in Wayne County, Michigan
Romulus, Michigan
Inkster, Michigan
Westland, Michigan